The Central Institute of Indian Languages (CIIL) is an Indian research and teaching institute based in Mysuru, part of the  Language Bureau of the Ministry of Education. It was founded on 17 July 1969.

Centres
The Central Institute of Indian Languages has seven centres:
Centre for Classical Languages
Centre for Tribal, Minor, Endangered Languages and Languages Policy
Centre for Lexicography, Folklore, Literature and Translation Studies
Centre for Literacy Studies
Centre for Testing & Evaluation
Centre for Materials Production, Publications and Sales 
Centre for Information in Indian Languages

Notes and references

See also 
 Language education
 Languages of India
 List of Language Self-Study Programs

External links
 

Ministry of Education (India)
Languages of India
Linguistic research in India
Linguistic research institutes in India
Universities and colleges in Mysore